Lloyd White may refer to:

 Lloyd White (diplomat) (1918–1981), New Zealand diplomat and public servant
 Lloyd White (rugby league) (born 1988), Welsh rugby league footballer